Silver Pistol is an album by Brinsley Schwarz, released in 1972. It was the first album to include Ian Gomm.

Critical reception
AllMusic wrote: "Silver Pistol isn't the definitive pub rock album, but it is the first great record to surface from the scene. Like much of the first wave of pub rock, Silver Pistol is quiet, laid-back and low-key -- with its warm, rustic sound and a gentleness that infuses even the rockers, this is the closest to the Band that the Brinsleys got."

Track listing
All tracks composed by Nick Lowe; except where indicated
"Dry Land" (Ian Gomm) – 2:42
"Merry Go Round" – 4:11
"One More Day" (Ian Gomm) – 2:54
"Nightingale" – 3:07
"Silver Pistol" – 3:38
"The Last Time I Was Fooled" – 4:05
"Unknown Number" – 2:58
"Range War" (Ian Gomm) – 2:34
"Egypt" – 5:23
"Niki Hoeke Speedway" (Jim Ford) – 3:30
"Ju Ju Man" (Jim Ford, Lolly Vegas) – 3:37
"Rockin' Chair" (Ian Gomm) – 2:27

Personnel
Brinsley Schwarz
 Brinsley Schwarz	 - 	guitar
 Ian Gomm	 - 	guitar, bass, vocals
 Billy Rankin	 - 	drums
 Bob Andrews	 - 	keyboards, vocals
 Nick Lowe	 - 	bass, guitar, vocals
Technical
Anton Matthews	 - 	engineer, mixing
Chris Hollebone - mobile engineer
Jeff Powell	 - 	design, art direction
Dave Robinson	 - 	producer

References

Brinsley Schwarz albums
1972 albums
United Artists Records albums